The Potato Factory is a 1995 fictionalised historical novel by Bryce Courtenay, which was made into a four-part miniseries in Australia in 2000. The book is the first in a three-part series, followed by Tommo & Hawk and Solomon's Song. The Potato Factory has been the subject of some controversy regarding its historical accuracy and its portrayal of Jewish characters.

The book is based on Ikey Solomon, known as the "Prince of Fences" and the basis of the Fagin character in the Charles Dickens novel Oliver Twist. Courtenay states that it is a fictional historical novel based on extensive research, but it depicts fictionalised versions of the characters. Author Judith Sackville-O'Donnell, who wrote another book on Solomon, claimed that the book was inaccurate and anti-Semitic.

The book's other main characters are Solomon's wife, Hannah, and his (fictional) mistress, Mary Abacus. Abacus goes from serving girl, to prostitute, to high-class madam, to prisoner transported to Tasmania, to successful businesswoman. She gets her name for her outstanding ability to use an abacus.

The story starts in London in the early 19th century. Abacus and Ikey Solomon start working together as business partners. It follows them as they are separately sent to Tasmania, a penal colony at the time.

Abacus takes up the art of brewing and establishes a pub called The Potato Factory while raising her children by Solomon.  Meanwhile, Hannah, who also has children, views Abacus as her bitter rival.  The book tells of Hannah's attempts to destroy Abacus.

References

External links
The Potato Factory at the National Film and Sound Archive

1995 Australian novels
1990s Australian television miniseries
1995 Australian television series debuts
1995 Australian television series endings
1995 television films
1995 films
Australian historical novels
Novels by Bryce Courtenay
Novels set in London
Novels set in Tasmania
Heinemann (publisher) books
Novels set in the 19th century